Tesco plc is a British multinational groceries and general merchandise retailer headquartered in Welwyn Garden City, England. In 2011 it was the third-largest retailer in the world measured by gross revenues and the ninth-largest in the world measured by revenues. It has shops in Ireland, the United Kingdom, the Czech Republic, Hungary, and Slovakia. It is the market leader of groceries in the UK (where it has a market share of around 28.4%).

Tesco has expanded globally since the early 1990s, with operations in 11 other countries in the world. The company pulled out of the US in 2013, but  continues to see growth elsewhere. Since the 1960s, Tesco has diversified into areas such as the retailing of books, clothing, electronics, furniture, toys, petrol, software, financial services, telecoms and internet services. In the 1990s, Tesco re-positioned itself from being a downmarket high-volume low-cost retailer, attempting to attract a range of social groups with its low-cost "Tesco Value" range (launched 1993) and premium "Tesco Finest" range.

Tesco is listed on the London Stock Exchange and is a constituent of the FTSE 100 Index.

History

Origins
Jack Cohen, the son of Jewish migrants from Poland, founded Tesco in 1919 when he began to sell war-surplus groceries from a stall at Well Street Market, Hackney, in the East End of London. The Tesco brand first appeared in 1924. The name came about after Jack Cohen bought a shipment of tea from Thomas Edward Stockwell. He made new labels using the initials of the supplier's name (TES), and the first two letters of his surname (CO), forming the word TESCO. After experimenting with his first permanent indoor market stall at Tooting in November 1930, Jack Cohen opened the first Tesco shop in September 1931 at 54 Watling Street, Burnt Oak, Edgware, Middlesex. Tesco was floated on the London Stock Exchange in 1947 as Tesco Stores (Holdings) Limited. The first self-service shop opened in St Albans in 1956 (which remained operational until 2010 before relocating to larger premises on the same street, with a period as a Tesco Metro), and the first supermarket in Maldon in 1956.

Expansion

During the 1950s and 1960s, Tesco grew organically, and also through acquisitions, until it owned more than 800 shops. The company purchased 70 Williamson's shops (1957), 200 Harrow Stores outlets (1959), 212 Irwins shops (1960), 97 Charles Phillips shops (1964) and the Victor Value chain (1968) (sold to Bejam in 1986).

Jack Cohen's business motto was "pile it high and sell it cheap", to which he added an internal motto of "YCDBSOYA" (You Can't Do Business Sitting On Your Arse) which he used to motivate his sales force.

In May 1987, Tesco completed its hostile takeover of the Hillards chain of 40 supermarkets in the North of England for £220 million.

In 1994, the company took over the supermarket chain William Low after fighting off Sainsbury's for control of the Dundee-based firm, which operated 57 shops. This paved the way for Tesco to expand its presence in Scotland, in which its presence was weaker than in England.

Tesco introduced a loyalty card, branded 'Clubcard' in 1995, and later an Internet shopping service. In 1996 the typeface of the logo was changed to the current version with stripe reflections underneath, whilst the corporate font used for shop signage was changed from the familiar "typewriter" font that had been used since the 1970s. Overseas operations were introduced in the same year. Terry Leahy assumed the role of Chief Executive on 21 February 1997, the appointment having been announced on 21 November 1995.

On 21 March 1997, Tesco announced the purchase of the retail arm of Associated British Foods, which consisted of the Quinnsworth, Stewarts and Crazy Prices chains in Ireland and Northern Ireland, and associated businesses, for £640 million. The deal was approved by the European Commission on 6 May 1997.

The company was the subject of a letter bomb campaign lasting five months from August 2000 to February 2001 as a bomber calling himself "Sally" sent letter bombs to Tesco customers and demanded that Clubcards be modified to be capable of withdrawing money from cash machines.

Diversification

The company started to expand the range of products it sold during the 1960s to include household goods and clothing under the Delamare brand, and in 1974 opened its first petrol station.

In 2001, Tesco became involved in internet grocery retailing in the US when it obtained a 35% stake in GroceryWorks.

In 2002, Tesco purchased 13 HIT hypermarkets in Poland. It also made a major move into the UK's convenience shop market with its purchase of T&S Stores, owner of 870 convenience shops in the One Stop, Dillons, and Day & Nite chains in the UK.

In June 2003, Tesco purchased the C Two-Network in Japan. It also acquired a majority stake in the Turkish supermarket chain Kipa. In January 2004, Tesco acquired Adminstore, owner of 45 Cullens, Europa, and Harts convenience shops, in and around London.

In Thailand, Tesco Lotus was a joint venture of the Charoen Pokphand Group and Tesco, but facing criticism over the growth of hypermarkets CP Group sold its Tesco Lotus shares in 2003. In late 2005 Tesco acquired the 21 remaining Safeway/BP shops after Morrisons dissolved the Safeway/BP partnership.

In 2006, Tesco announced plans to move into the United States by opening a chain of small-format groceries in the Western states (Arizona, California, and Nevada) in 2007 named Fresh & Easy. Tesco would eventually pull out of the United States market in 2013, following performance issues.

2010s
In 2010, Tesco started funding a small film studio intended to produce Tesco-exclusive direct-to-DVD films. The first film was released on 6 September called Paris Connections, based on a popular novel by Jackie Collins.

In 2013, Tesco confirmed that it was pulling out of its US market (Fresh & Easy) stores in April, after it filed for Chapter 11 bankruptcy, at a reported cost of £1.2 billion. In September, Tesco announced that it would sell the business to Ronald Burkle's Yucaipa Companies for an undisclosed amount. That same month, Tesco launched its first tablet computer, a seven-inch model called Hudl. Tesco also purchased the restaurant and cafe chain Giraffe for £48.6 million.

In 2015, Tesco confirmed the sale of its Blinkbox on-demand video service and its fixed-line telephone and broadband business to TalkTalk. In January, Tesco sold the Blinkbox Music streaming service to now-defunct Guvera, and confirmed it would close its Blinkbox Books service by the end of February.

In 2016, Tesco confirmed it was seeking to sell Dobbies Garden Centres, Giraffe Restaurants, and Harris + Hoole to concentrate on its main supermarket business.

In 2017, it was announced that Tesco had reached an agreement to merge with Britain's biggest wholesaler Booker Group. There were however concerns over market dominance with Tesco being Britain's largest food retailer and Booker being the UK's largest wholesaler.  In April, the company confirmed it would sell its in-shop opticians' business to Vision Express. In June, Tesco announced a major cost-cutting initiative that would reduce the company's workforce by over 1,200 workers. Key reductions included over a quarter of its employees in Welwyn Garden City and Hatfield, and the closure of the call centre in Cardiff. The company hoped to reduce costs by £1.5 billion.

In 2019, Tesco announced another cost-cutting initiative that would close the food counters in 90 stores, affecting around 9,000 workers. In October 2019, Tesco announced that CEO Dave Lewis would step down in 2020, and would be succeeded by Ken Murphy.

UK operations
As of 2017, Tesco's UK shop portfolio was as follows:

Tesco

Hypermarkets

Tesco Extra shops are larger, mainly out-of-town hypermarkets that stock nearly all of Tesco's product ranges, although some are in the heart of town centres and inner-city locations.

Supermarkets

Tesco Superstores are standard large supermarkets, stocking groceries and a much smaller range of non-food goods than Extra hypermarkets. The shops have always been branded as 'Tesco', but a new shop in Liverpool was the first to use the format brand 'Tesco Superstore' above the door.

Tesco operates a number of in-shop cafes but also began to introduce new restaurants in its shops from 2013 under the "Decks Carvery" brand.

Tesco Express

Tesco Express shops are neighbourhood convenience shops averaging , stocking mainly food with an emphasis on higher-margin products such as sweets, crisps, chocolate, biscuits, fizzy drinks, and processed food (due to small shop size, and the necessity to maximise revenue per square foot) alongside everyday essentials. They are located in busy city-centre districts, small shopping precincts in residential areas, small towns, and villages, and on Esso petrol station forecourts. In 2010 it became known that Tesco was operating Express pricing, charging more in its Express branches than in its other stores. A spokesperson said that this was "because of the difference in costs of running the smaller shops".

Fuel stations

Tesco first started selling petrol in 1974. Tesco sells 95, 97, and 99 RON (a fuel developed by Greenergy of which Tesco is a shareholder) petrol from forecourts at most Superstore and Extra locations. Tesco recently diversified into biofuels, offering petrol-bioethanol and diesel-biodiesel blends instead of pure petrol and diesel at its petrol stations, and now offering Greenergy 100% biodiesel at many shops in the southeast of the United Kingdom. In 1998, Tesco and Esso (part of ExxonMobil) formed a business alliance that included several petrol filling stations on lease from Esso, with Tesco operating the attached shops under its Express format. In turn, Esso operates the forecourts and sells fuel via the Tesco shop. As of 2013, there were 200 joint Tesco Express/Esso sites in the UK.

Online

In the United Kingdom Tesco operates a home shopping service through the Tesco.com website. In May 1984, in Gateshead, England, Mrs. Jane Snowball used a piece of computer technology called "Videotex" on her television to purchase groceries from her local Tesco shop in the world's first recorded online shopping transaction from the home. As of November 2006, Tesco was the only food retailer to make online shopping profitable. Since 2006 Tesco has operated a number of dark stores dedicated to the fulfilment of online orders of groceries.

Loyalty card

Tesco launched its customer loyalty scheme, the Tesco Clubcard, in 1995. It has been cited as a pivotal development in Tesco's progress towards becoming the UK's largest supermarket chain and one that fundamentally changed the country's supermarket business. Tesco itself was cited in a Wall Street Journal article as using the intelligence from the Clubcard to thwart Wal-Mart's initiatives in the UK.

Cardholders can collect one Clubcard point for every £1 (or one point for €1 in Ireland and Slovakia or 1 point for 1zł in Poland) they spend in a Tesco shop, or at Tesco.com, and 1 point per £2 on fuel (not in Slovakia). Customers can also collect points by paying with a Tesco Credit Card, or by using Tesco Mobile, Tesco Homephone, Tesco Broadband, selected Tesco Personal Finance products, or through Clubcard partners, E.ON and Avis. Each point equates to 1p in shops when redeemed, or up to four times that value when used with Clubcard deals (offers for holidays, day trips, etc.) Clubcard points (UK & IE) can also be converted to Avios and Virgin Atlantic frequent flyer miles.

One Stop

One Stop, which includes some of the smallest shops (smaller than a Tesco Express), was (until 2018, when the first Jack's store opened) the only Tesco shop format in the UK that did not include the word Tesco in its name. The brand, along with the original shops, formed part of the T&S Stores business but, unlike many that were converted to Tesco Express, these kept their old name. Subsequently, other shops bought by Tesco have been converted to the One Stop brand. Some have Tesco Bank branded cash machines. The business has attracted some controversy, as the prices of groceries in these shops, often situated in more impoverished areas, can be higher than nearby Tesco branded shops, highlighted in The Times 22 March 2010: "Britain's biggest supermarket uses its chain of 639 One Stop convenience shops–which many customers do not realise it owns–to charge up to 14 per cent more for goods than it does in Tesco-branded shops."

Tesco responded to the article stating "It is a separate business within the Tesco Group, with its own supply chain and distribution network. One Stop shops offer a different range to Express shops and its operating costs are different. One Stop's price strategy is to match to its nearest competitor, Costcutter, and is frequently cheaper."

Subsidiaries

Booker Group

Tesco completed its acquisition of the food wholesaler Booker in March 2018. Booker also owns the Budgens, Londis, Euro Shopper, and Premier Stores brands which operate under franchises.

Tesco Bank

In the United Kingdom Tesco offers financial services through Tesco Bank, formerly a 50:50 joint venture with The Royal Bank of Scotland. Products on offer include credit cards, loans, mortgages, savings accounts, and several types of insurance, including car, home, life, and travel. They are promoted by leaflets in Tesco's shops and through its website. The business made a profit of £130 million for the 52 weeks to 24 February 2007, of which Tesco's share was £66 million. This move towards the financial sector diversified the Tesco brand and provides opportunities for growth outside of the retailing sector. On 28 July 2008, Tesco announced that it would buy out the Royal Bank of Scotland's 50% stake in the company for £950 million.

F&F
F&F launched in 2001 as Florence & Fred in Tesco's UK and Ireland supermarkets. In 2010, the brand started to open stores in of itself starting with a London store. In the early to mid-2010s, it expanded to multiple countries stores and online.

In the UK, F&F had its own website until 2016 when it was folded into Tesco Direct - which itself folded in August 2018. After this, F&F had no online UK presence until it partnered with Next PLC a year later. Tesco launched a scaled-down F&F on Tesco.com soon after its deal with Next.

Tesco Mobile

Tesco operates a mobile phone business across the United Kingdom, Ireland, Slovakia, Hungary, and the Czech Republic. It first launched in the UK in 2003 as a joint venture with O2 and operates as a mobile virtual network operator (MVNO) using the network of O2 with the exceptions of Hungary where the network of Vodafone Hungary is used and Ireland where Three Ireland is used. As a virtual operator, Tesco Mobile does not own or operate its own network infrastructure. By January 2011 Tesco announced it had over 2.5 million UK mobile customers.

Tesco also operated a home telephone and broadband business. Its broadband service was launched in August 2004 to complement its existing internet service provider business, providing an ADSL-based service delivered via BT phone lines. In January 2015, Tesco sold its home telephone and broadband business, together with Blinkbox, to TalkTalk for around £5 million. Its customers were transferred by 2016.

Tesco Tech Support
Tesco acquired a small I.T. support company called The PC Guys in 2007, and were able to launch Tesco Tech Support in December 2008.

Former operations

Tesco Home 'n' Wear
In the 1960s, Tesco set up a non-food division, Tesco Home 'n' Wear, headed by Leslie Porter. It had stand-alone shops and departments in larger shops, and from 1975 a distribution centre in Milton Keynes. Although Tesco continued to stock non-food items the stand-alone shops were closed and the name was no longer in use when Tesco Extra was launched.

Tesco Homeplus
In May 2005, Tesco announced a trial non-food only format near Manchester and Aberdeen, and the first shop opened in October 2005. The shops offered all of Tesco's ranges except food in warehouse-style units in retail parks. Tesco introduced the format as only 20% of its customers had access to a Tesco Extra, and the company was restricted in how many of its superstores it could convert into Extras and how quickly it could do so. Large units for non-food retailing are much more readily available. The format was not Tesco's first non-food-only venture in the UK. Until the late 1990s/early 2000s there were several non-food Tesco shops around the country including Scarborough and Yate. Although not in a warehouse-style format, the shops were located on high streets and shopping centres and stocked similar items to Homeplus shops. In both cases, this was because another part of the shopping centre had a Tesco Superstore that stocked food items only. By 2014, the number of Homeplus shops in the United Kingdom had reached 12; the newest shop opened in Chester in July 2009. In 2012 it was reported that Tesco was looking to close the business to focus on groceries. Tesco closed six Homeplus shops on 15 March 2015, and the remaining six shops closed on 27 June 2015.

Tesco Metro 

Tesco Metro shops were sized between Tesco superstores and Tesco Express shops, with shops averaging . They are mainly located in town centres and similar urban locations and were designed to accommodate larger weekly shops as well as top-up shopping.

In May 2021, Tesco announced the brand would be retired as only 31% of customers were using the stores for larger shops. 89 locations converted to the Tesco Express format while the remaining 58 adopted the standard superstore format.

Dobbies Garden Centres

Dobbies is a chain of garden centres across Scotland, England, and Northern Ireland. Tesco completed its acquisition of Dobbies in 2008, and the company continued to trade under its own brand, from its own head office in Melville, near Edinburgh. On 17 June 2016, Tesco sold the company on to a group of investors led by Midlothian Capital Partners and Hattington Capital for £217 million.

Harris + Hoole

In 2012, Tesco invested in a new coffee shop chain, named Harris + Hoole after coffee-loving characters in Samuel Pepys' diary. Tesco took full ownership of the business from its founders Nick, Andrew and Laura Tolley in February 2016, and agreed in June 2016 to sell it to Caffè Nero.

Giraffe
Giraffe is a restaurant chain in the United Kingdom which Tesco purchased in March 2013 as part of a strategy of making use of excess space in its shops. Tesco sold the chain to Boparan Holdings in June 2016.

Euphorium Bakery
Euphorium Bakery opened a concession in Tesco's Kensington shop in 2012, and in 2013 Tesco bought a stake in the business. It purchased the remaining stake in April 2015. In August 2016, Tesco sold Euphorium's high street shops and factory in Islington to Soho Coffee, and its factory in Weybridge to Samworth Brothers.

Jack's

In 2018, Tesco launched a separate budget chain, Jack's, to compete with Lidl and Aldi; the first store opened in Chatteris, Cambridgeshire in September 2018. In January 2022 Tesco announced it would be shutting down its Jack's stores, with stores either being closed or converted to Tesco Superstores.

Current international operations
Tesco has expanded its operations from the United Kingdom to 11 other countries.  Tesco pulled out of the United States in 2013 but continues to see growth elsewhere. Tesco's international expansion strategy has responded to the need to be sensitive to local expectations in other countries by entering into joint ventures with local partners, such as Samsung Group in South Korea (Samsung-Tesco Home plus), and Charoen Pokphand in Thailand (Tesco Lotus), appointing a very high proportion of local personnel to management positions. It also makes small acquisitions as part of its strategy: for example, in its 2005/2006 financial year, it made acquisitions in South Korea, one in Poland, and one in Japan.

Overview Of Operations
The following table shows the number of stores, total store size in area, and sales for Tesco's international operations.

Former operations

Czech Republic  

Tesco opened its first store in the Czech Republic in 1996 and now has over 300 stores, with further planned. Tesco opened its first stores in the Czech Republic by buying US corporation Kmart's operations in the country and converting them into Tesco stores. Tesco is also keen to expand non-food items and has already opened petrol stations and offers personal finance services in the Czech Republic.

Hungary 

Tesco launched in Hungary in 1994 (November 23) after purchasing a small local supermarket group trading as S-Market based in Szombathely, in the west of Hungary. It opened its first hypermarket in Hungary at the Polus Centre in Budapest in 1996. Tesco operates through more than 200 stores in Hungary with further openings planned. Tesco Hungary also offers a clothing line and personal finance services.

Slovakia 

Tesco Slovakia in 1996 as part of Tesco's international expansion aims. It now operates from 123 stores. Tesco Slovakia has recently put great emphasis on organic products. However, Tesco Slovakia caused controversy amongst the Slovak government when it was found to have come foul of food safety laws in 2006. In April 2010 the first Tesco Extra in Central Europe opened in Bratislava – Petržalka, Slovakia as part of a pilot project for Tesco in the region, including the first self-service cash flow in Central Europe. There are currently seven Tesco Extra stores in Slovakia – three in Bratislava and one in Zvolen, Trnava, Banská Bystrica and Spišská Nová Ves.

Ireland 

Tesco first operated in the Irish grocery market in the early 1980s, selling its operations there in March 1986. Tesco re-entered the Irish market in 1997 after the purchase of Power Supermarkets Ltd. It now operates from 154 stores across Ireland. Like Tesco stores in the UK, these offer a home delivery shopping service available to 80% of the Irish population as well as petrol, mobile telephone, personal finance, flower delivery service, and a weight-loss programme. Tesco's loyalty programme, Clubcard, is offered in the country. Tesco had approximately 21% of the Irish grocery market in 2019 and its main competitors are Dunnes Stores and SuperValu.

Tesco Ireland claims to be the largest purchaser of Irish food with an estimated €1.5 billion annually. Tesco Ireland operates a number of Tesco Extra hypermarkets in Ireland, with Clarehall Extra on the Malahide Road being the first to open in 2006.

Spain (including Ibiza), Portugal, and Gibraltar 
Tesco supplies six stores to date in Spain (including Ibiza), Portugal, and Gibraltar that operate under the name The Food Company. Operations started in 2019 with the first store opening in Puerto de Mazarrón located in the Murcia province of Spain. One other store opened in the Algarve, Portugal in 2019 followed by four more in 2020 in Gibraltar, Ibiza, Mijas (Malaga), and Quesada (Alicante). All 7500 Products stocked by The Food Company originate from Britain.

India 
Tesco has had a limited presence in India with a service centre in Bangalore, and outsourcing. In 2008 Tesco announced their intention to invest an initial £60m ($115m) to open a wholesale cash-and-carry business based in Mumbai with the assistance of the Tata Group. In 2014, the joint venture between Tesco and Tata was confirmed, where investment by the earlier was reportedly 140 million dollars, thus becoming the first foreign supermarket to enter the country. The stores are now operated under the banner Star Bazaar and Star Daily supermarkets.

Pakistan 

On 16 February 2017 Tesco announced a wholesale partnership with Limestone Private Limited, owner of the Alpha Superstores chain. This involved an exclusive partnership which would see Tesco products stocked across Alpha Supermarket stores within Pakistan.

Former international operations

China 
Tesco acquired a 50% stake in the Hymall chain, from Ting Hsin in September 2004. In December 2006 it raised its stake to 90% in a £180 million deal. Most of Tesco China's stores were based around Shanghai. Tesco had a large store in Weifang, Shandong province, and a further two-floor store in Taizhou, Jiangsu province. Tesco had been increasing its own brand products into the Chinese market as well as introducing the Tesco Express format. In May 2014 Tesco made a deal with the state-run China Resources Enterprise (CRE) to create a joint venture, combining Tesco's 131 stores in the country with CRE's nearly 3,000 outlets. With Tesco owning 20% of the business and CRE 80% this became the largest food retailer in China. In February 2020, Tesco announced that it would exit the China market by selling the 20% stake to CRE for £275 million.

France 
Tesco owned a French food retailer called Catteau between 1993 and 1997, which operated a chain of 92 stores in NE France under the Cedico, Hyper Cedico, and Cedimarche banners. Tesco also operated a "Vin Plus" outlet in Calais, selling wine, beer, and spirits, which closed on 30 August 2010, due to the decline of the booze cruise.

Japan 
Tesco Japan first began operations in 2003. It was brought about by a buy-out of C Two stores for £139 million in July 2003 and later Fre'c in April 2004. Tesco has adopted an approach that focuses on small corner shops that operate similarly to its Express format, rather than opening hypermarkets. It has also launched its range of software in Japan. In August 2011, Tesco announced that they would be selling off their Japanese stores to ÆON after revealing that only half of the stores in the Greater Tokyo Area were making a profit.  Market share in the country was never above 1 percent.

Malaysia 

Tesco opened its first store in Malaysia in May 2002 with the opening of its first hypermarket in Puchong, Selangor. Tesco Malaysia currently operates 49 Tesco and Tesco Extra stores. Tesco has partnered with local conglomerate Sime Darby Berhad, which holds 30% of the shares. In April 2013, Tesco Malaysia launched the Grocery Home Shopping Service, where it delivered groceries ordered via the Internet to consumers, with no minimum purchase imposed. The Malaysian operation of Tesco also included a convenience store, Tesco Pernama Ekspres, which began operation in February 2015. In 2020, Tesco agreed to sell its Malaysian business to the Thailand-based, Charoen Pokphand Group for US$10.6bn, including debt. With this sale having been completed, Tesco has now changed its name to Lotus's.

Poland 

Tesco entered the Polish market in 1995 acquiring local Polish supermarket chains- Minor, Madex, and Savia, and opened its first hypermarket in Wrocław Bielany in 1998. At the height of its operations in Poland the company operated from over 450 various format stores as well as an online shopping service. Tesco Poland offered a broad range of brands on the Polish market including its own branded line of products as well as regional produce, petrol, personal finance services and on-line photo processing. In August 2008 Tesco opened the first Extra store in Poland located in Częstochowa. In November 2019, having suffered years of net losses and despite extensive cost-cutting and attempts at streamlining of its business model, Tesco announced its intent to sell all of its operations in Poland. In 2020 Tesco Poland was bought by Salling Group. The last remaining stores closed down on 28 October 2021.

South Korea 

Tesco launched its South Korean operations as "Homeplus" in 1999 and partnered with Samsung. Tesco held 94% of the shares in the venture. It was the second largest retailer in South Korea, just behind Shinsegae Group. On 14 May 2008, Tesco agreed to purchase 36 hypermarkets with a combination of food and non-food products from E-Land for $1.9 billion (£976 million) in its biggest single acquisition, making Tesco the second largest in the country. The majority of the E-Land stores formerly belonged to French retailer Carrefour before 2006 and most of the stores will be converted to Home plus outlets. Tesco's South Korean discount store chain, Home Plus, currently has 66 outlets. In September 2015 the company was sold to MBK Partners, a South Korean buyout firm, which partnered with a Canadian pension fund and Singapore's Temasek Holdings in a transaction worth 4.2 billion pounds.

Thailand 

Tesco entered Thailand in 1998 and operates through 380 stores as part of a joint venture with Charoen Pokphand and named the operation "Tesco Lotus". This partnership was dissolved in 2003 when Charoen Pokphand sold its shares to Tesco. Tesco Lotus claims to serve 20 million customers every month and that 97% of its goods are sourced from Thailand. By March 2013, Thailand operations were generating £3 billion in revenues and were one of the company's largest businesses outside of the UK. Tesco agreed to sell its Thai business to Charoen Pokphand Group for $10.6bn, including debt. A transaction that would be expected to be completed in the second half of 2020. With this sale having been completed, Tesco Lotus has now changed its name to Lotus's.

Turkey 

Tesco entered the Turkish market in 2003 and uses the trading name "Tesco Kipa". Tesco remains focused on building infrastructure in Turkey to complete its expansion plans and introduced the Tesco Express format into Turkey in 2006. There are plans to increase the rate of expansion as basic infrastructure is built. On June 2016, Tesco announced that it would sell its Turkish stores to its competitor, Migros Türk.

United States 

Tesco entered the United States grocery market in 2007 through the opening of a new chain of convenience stores, named Fresh & Easy, on the West Coast (Arizona, California, and Nevada). The company established its U.S. headquarters in El Segundo, California, and the first store opened in Hemet, California in November 2007, with 100 more planned in the first year; a store opening every two-and-a-half days. It announced the sale of 150 of the stores in the 200-strong chain to private equity firm Yucaipa Companies in September 2013. The BBC reported that the remaining stores were expected to close. The deal included Tesco loaning the venture £80m and retaining an option to buy back a stake in the business if Yucaipa succeeded in turning around the group's performance. The last Fresh & Easy store closed in 2015.

Corporate affairs

Corporate strategy

According to Citigroup retail analyst David McCarthy, "[Tesco has] pulled off a trick that I'm not aware of any other retailer achieving. That is to appeal to all segments of the market". One plank of this strategy has been Tesco's use of its own-brand products, including the upmarket "Finest", mid-range Tesco brand and low-price "Value" encompassing several product categories such as food, beverage, home, clothing, Tesco Mobile and financial services. Tesco have two vegan ranges branded "Plant Chef" and "Wicked Kitchen".

Beginning in 1997 when Terry Leahy took over as CEO, Tesco began marketing itself using the phrase "The Tesco Way" to describe the company's core purposes, values, principles, and goals This phrase became the standard marketing speak for Tesco as it expanded domestically and internationally under Leahy's leadership, implying a shift by the company to focus on people, both customers, and employees.

A core part of the Tesco expansion strategy has been its innovative use of technology. It was one of the first to build self-service tills and use cameras to reduce queues, and an early adopter of NFC contactless payment card technology. In 2016, Tesco developed a mobile payment wallet, PayQwiq using both NFC contactless and barcode technology to allow payment using mobile phones in-shop (along with supporting other contactless mobile wallets such as ApplePay).

Financial performance
All figures below are for the Tesco financial years, which run for 52- or 53-week periods to late February.

Despite being in a recession, Tesco made record profits for a British retailer in the year to February 2010, during which its underlying pre-tax profits increased by 10.1% to £3.4 billion. Tesco then planned to create 16,000 new jobs, 9,000 in the UK. In 2011 the retailer reported its poorest six-monthly UK sales figures for 20 years, attributed to consumers' reduced non-food spending and a growth in budget rivals.

By 2014, Tesco appeared to have lost some of its appeal to customers. The share price lost 49 per cent of its value up to October as it struggled to fend off competition from rivals Aldi and Lidl. In October 2014, Tesco suspended 8 executives following its announcement the previous month that it had previously overstated its profits by £250 million. The misreporting resulted in almost £2.2 billion being wiped off the value of the company's stock market value. The suspended executives included former commercial director Kevin Grace and UK managing director Chris Bush. The profit overstatement was subsequently revised upwards to £263 million following an investigation by the accountancy firm Deloitte, and it was clarified that the inflated profit figure was the result of Tesco bringing forward rebates from suppliers. The Serious Fraud Office (SFO) confirmed on 29 October 2014 that it was carrying out a criminal investigation into the accounting irregularities but declined to give further details. As a result, Tesco agreed to pay a fine and compensation. Three executives charged with fraud and false accounting in connection with the misreporting were cleared of the charges in 2018–2019.

Market share

According to Kantar Worldpanel, Tesco's share of the UK groceries market in the 12 weeks to 18 March 2012 was 30.2%, down from 30.6% in the 12 weeks to 18 March 2011.

In terms of the wider UK retail market, Tesco sales account for around one pound in every ten spent in British shops. In 2007 it was reported that its share was even larger, with one pound in every seven spent going to Tesco. In 2006, Inverness was branded as "Tescotown", because well over 50p in every £1 spent on food is believed to be spent in its three Tesco shops. By 2014 competition from other retailers led to a fall in Tesco's market share to 28.7%; this was the lowest level in a decade.

Corporate social responsibility
Tesco made a commitment to corporate social responsibility in the form of contributions of 1.87% in 2006 of its pre-tax profits to charities and local community organisations. This compares favourably with Marks & Spencer, whose 1.51% is lower than Sainsbury's 7.02%. This figure, £42 million is lower than the amount of money reported to have been avoided in tax during 2007 (see below). Will Hutton, in his role as chief executive of The Work Foundation, in 2007 praised Tesco for leading the debate on corporate responsibility. However Intelligent Giving has criticised the company for directing all "staff giving" support to the company's Charity of the Year.

In 1992, Tesco started a "computers for schools scheme", offering computers in return for vouchers given to Tesco customers and donated by them to schools and hospitals. Until 2004, £92 million of equipment went to these organisations. The scheme was also implemented in Poland.

In 2009, Tesco used the phrase, "Change for Good" as advertising, which is trademarked by Unicef for charity usage but not for commercial or retail use, which prompted the agency to say, "It is the first time in Unicef's history that a commercial entity has purposely set out to capitalise on one of our campaigns and subsequently damage an income stream which several of our programmes for children are dependent on." It went on to call on the public "...who have children's welfare at heart, to consider carefully who they support when making consumer choices."

Tesco's own-labels personal care and household products are stated to be cruelty-free, meaning that they are not tested on animals.

In June 2011, Tesco announced that it was working with 2degrees Network to create an online hub as part of its target to reduce its supply chain carbon footprint by 30% by 2020.

In September 2011, a Greenpeace report revealed that Tesco supermarkets in China were selling vegetables that contained pesticides at levels exceeding the legal limit, or were illegal. A green vegetable sample from Tesco turned up methamidophos and monocrotophos, the use of which has been prohibited in China since the beginning of 2007.

Advertising

A notable 1980s advert was "Checkout 82," which was made in 1982, where a till would have a receipt coming out of it with the prices on. This advert had synthpop music as the backing and people singing "Check it out, check it out".

Adverts in the early 1990s had a man called David, portrayed by Dudley Moore, on the hunt for free-range chickens from France and discovering many goods from around the world to purchase for Tesco. Late 2000s adverts included many celebrities and celebrity voice-overs such as The Spice Girls and the voice of actors James Nesbitt and Jane Horrocks.

Tesco's main advertising slogan is "Every little helps". Its advertisements in print and on television mainly consist of product shots (or an appropriate image, such as a car when advertising petrol) against a white background, with a price or appropriate text (e.g., "Tesco Value") superimposed on a red circle.

Tesco's in-shop magazine is one of the largest-circulation magazines in the United Kingdom, with a circulation of 1.9 million .

In November 2013, Tesco announced it would introduce face-scanning technology developed by Amscreen at all of its 450 UK petrol stations to target advertisements to individual customers.

Criticism

Criticism of Tesco includes allegations of stifling competition due to its undeveloped "land bank", and breaching planning laws.

Litigation
The Tesco supermarket chain is involved in litigation such as the Ward v Tesco Stores Ltd and Tesco Supermarkets Ltd v Nattrass cases. Tesco has been criticised for aggressively pursuing critics of the company in Thailand. Writer and former MP Jit Siratranont faced up to two years in jail and a £16.4 million libel damages claim for saying that Tesco was expanding aggressively at the expense of small local retailers. Tesco served him with writs for criminal defamation and civil libel. The Thai court dismissed the case, ruling that the criticism made by the defendant was 'in good faith by way of fair comment on any person or thing subjected to public criticism'.

In November 2007, Tesco sued a Thai academic and a former minister for civil libel and criminal defamation, insisting that the two pay £1.6 million and £16.4 million and receive two years' imprisonment respectively. They have been alleged to have misstated that Tesco's Thai market amounts to 37% of its global revenues, amongst criticism of Tesco's propensity to put small retailers out of business.

In August 2013, Tesco was fined £300,000 after admitting that it misled customers over the pricing of "half-price" strawberries.

Animal welfare
Tesco has received criticism for supplying meat from intensive animal farms.

In May 2021, undercover footage captured showed piglets deemed too small or too weak for the abattoir being hammered to death by farm workers or being swung against a concrete floor to be killed at a Tesco supplier. The practice, known as piglet thumping, is common on UK farms.

In July 2021, The Independent revealed chickens were being left to die of thirst in overcrowded sheds by a Tesco supplier. Some birds resorted to cannibalism, and many suffered ammonia burns.

In September 2019, footage shot at a self-described "ethical" farm that supplied Tesco showed birds being kicked and hurled into crates.

In September 2020, an investigation into a chicken farm that supplied Tesco found fast-growing birds that were in chronic pain and others that could barely stand up.

Use of caged eggs 
In May 2019 an undercover investigation of an Asian Tesco egg supplier, released by the Daily Mirror, found Tesco is serving Asian customers eggs from battery cage farms. In August 2019, an investigation of the company producing Tesco's own-brand eggs in Malaysia, broken by the New Straits Times, documented similar conditions. In response to the investigation, Tesco committed to using only cage-free eggs in Thailand and Malaysia.

Price-fixing
In 2007, Tesco was placed under investigation by the UK Office of Fair Trading (OFT) for acting as part of a cartel of five supermarkets (Safeway, Tesco, Asda, Morrisons, and Sainsburys) and a number of dairy companies to fix the price of milk, butter, and cheese. In December 2007, Asda, Sainsbury's, and the former Safeway admitted that they acted covertly against the interests of consumers while publicly claiming that they were supporting 5,000 farmers recovering from the foot-and-mouth crisis. They were fined a total of £116 million.

Corporate tax structure
In May 2007, it was reported that Tesco had moved the head office of its online operations to Switzerland. This allows it to sell CDs, DVDs, and electronic games through its website without charging value-added tax (VAT). The operation had previously been run from Jersey but had been closed by authorities who feared damage to the island's reputation.

In June 2008, the government announced that it was closing a tax loophole being used by Tesco. The scheme, identified by British magazine Private Eye, utilised offshore holding companies in Luxembourg and partnership agreements to reduce corporation tax liability by up to £50 million a year. Another scheme previously identified by Private Eye involved depositing £1 billion in a Swiss partnership, and then loaning that money to overseas Tesco shops, so that profit could be transferred indirectly through interest payments. This scheme was still in operation  and was estimated to be costing the UK exchequer up to £20 million a year in corporation tax. Tax expert Richard Murphy has provided an analysis of this avoidance structure.

Tax avoidance has not always been related to corporation tax. A number of companies including Tesco used a scheme to avoid VAT by deeming 2.5% of purchases paid for by card to be a 'card transaction fee', which reduced the company's tax liability without changing the charge to the customer. Such schemes came to light after HMRC litigated against Debenhams over the scheme in 2005.

Opposition to expansion

Tesco's expansion has been criticised, and in some cases actively opposed;
 Plans for a large Tesco shop in St Albans, Hertfordshire, attracted widespread local opposition. This led to the formation of the "Stop St Albans Tesco Group". In June 2008, St Albans Council refused planning permission for the proposed new shop.
 In April 2011, longstanding opposition to a Tesco Express shop in Cheltenham Road, Stokes Croft, Bristol, evolved into a violent clash between opponents and police. The recently opened shopfront was heavily damaged, and police reported the seizure of petrol bombs. Opponents have suggested that the shop would damage small shops and harm the character of the area.
 In March 2015 an arson attack gutted a new Tesco Express shop in Godalming, Surrey, two days before it was due to open.   Tesco had purchased a public house and converted it into the new store, a change which did not require planning permission, thus denying the vigorous local opposition any formal means of preventing it.  After continuing local opposition, including the local MP and borough council, Tesco abandoned its plans for the shop in January 2017.

Horse meat found in burgers

In January 2013, the British media reported that horse meat had been found in some meat products sold by Tesco, along with other retailers, particularly burgers. Prime Minister David Cameron called this "unacceptable", with products showing 29.1% horse meat in the "Value" range burger, which were supposed to be beef. It was later revealed in February 2013 that some of Tesco's Everyday Value Spaghetti Bolognese contained 60% horse meat. Tesco withdrew 26 of its products in response and announced that it was working with authorities and the supplier to investigate the cause of the contamination.

Guide dogs
Following a 2013 incident when the manager of Tesco in Sutton ordered a blind person and her guide dog to leave the shop, Tesco stated that its staff had received training to ensure that such an incident would not happen again. In 2014, Tesco staff shouted at a customer with a guide dog and told her not to return to the store. Tesco later said: "This clearly should never have happened and we will contact Ms Makri directly to apologise. We do allow guide dogs in stores and have reminded colleagues of that" and donated £5,000 to a guide dogs charity.

Slavery in Thailand
In 2014, The Guardian reported that Tesco is a client of Charoen Pokphand Foods. Over six months The Guardian traced the whole chain from slave ships in Asian waters to leading producers and retailers.

Sale of goods from Israel
Tesco has been targeted by protesters complaining the supermarket chain sells goods made in Israel, with most complaints being about products emanating from Israeli settlements in the West Bank. Protests generally occur when Israeli military operations are being carried out in the Gaza Strip or the West Bank. A protester was arrested at a protest at a shop in Birmingham on 16 August 2014.

Sale of anti-semitic books
In 2005, Searchlight magazine said it was "horrified" to discover anti-semitic books by US extremist publisher Liberty Bell on the Tesco website. Titles offered for sale included The Hitler We Loved and Why, The International Jew, and The Protocols of the Elders of Zion. Searchlight found another 106 titles by British-based publisher Steven Books which it describes as "so extreme that even the British National Party does not sell them". The shop said in a statement: "Tesco.com has over one million book titles covering a wide range of subjects. We are unhappy that titles which could cause offence to some customers have found their way on to our site and took immediate action to remove them once they were brought to our attention."

Suppliers
The UK Groceries Code Adjudicator found in a 2015–16 investigation into Tesco that some suppliers paid "large sums of money in exchange for category captaincy or participation in a price review". She found some evidence of benefits which suppliers derive from these arrangements but also recorded a concern—to be investigated further—as to whether the purpose of the Groceries Code was being circumvented by these payments.

Amazon rainforest deforestation
In June 2021 there were protests outside Tesco Headquarters in Welwyn Garden City due to the involvement of Tesco in deforestation and forest fires in Brazil, as this is where Tesco sources the soy used to feed livestock for their meat produce.

Allegation of xenophobia
On 21 November 2020, a member of the Romanian diaspora in the United Kingdom said that in the Telford store, there was a warning for shoplifters written in the Romanian language that said "notice for store thieves, you will be legally prosecuted if caught stealing". The Romanian Ministry of Foreign Affairs (MAE) expressed its "surprise and disagreement against the strongly discriminating message".

Chairmen 
 1947–1970: Sir Jack Cohen
 1970–1973: Hyman Kreitman
 1973–1985: Sir Leslie Porter
 1985–1997: Lord MacLaurin
 1997–2004: John Gardiner
 2004–2011: Sir David Reid
 2011–2015: Richard Broadbent
 March 2015–present: John Allan

Arms

See also

 List of supermarket chains in the United Kingdom
 Tesco Town
 Tesco Everyday Value
 Tesco Venture Brands
 Walmart

References

Further reading
 
 
 
 
 
 Videos
 Archived at Ghostarchive and the Wayback Machine:

External links

 
Corporate website

 
Arts and crafts retailers
Clothing retailers of the United Kingdom
Convenience stores
Multinational companies headquartered in England
Accounting scandals
British brands
Scandals in England
Supermarkets of the United Kingdom
Supermarkets of Northern Ireland
Supermarkets of Poland
Supermarkets of the Czech Republic
Supermarkets of Taiwan
British companies established in 1919
Retail companies established in 1919
1919 establishments in England
Companies listed on the London Stock Exchange